Chhatia Bata or Chhatia Jagannath Temple is a Hindu temple in the village of Chhatia, between the towns of Cuttack and Chandikhol in Odisha, in eastern India. It is devoted to Jagannath and associated with Kalki, the avatar of Vishnu.

Hadidas mentions this temple in the saga Maalika, predicting that "on a day when all living animals and humans will die and fish will play at the steps of Puri temple".

References

Temples dedicated to Jagannath
Hindu temples in Jajpur district
Archaeological monuments in Odisha